Northern Lights is a 1997 drama television film based upon the 1988 stage play of the same name by John Hoffman. Directed by Linda Yellen, the film stars Diane Keaton, Maury Chaykin, Joseph Cross, and Kathleen York. It was produced for the Disney Channel and premiered on August 23, 1997. Some sources identify Northern Lights as the first Disney Channel Original Movie, though Northern Lights was not included in Disney Channel's 100 Original Movies celebration that aired in May–June 2016, and Disney Channel considers 1997's Under Wraps to be the first official Disney Channel Original Movie.

Because her character was depicted as a heavy smoker, actress Diane Keaton thought production of the film was an odd choice for the Disney Channel.

Plot

Childless widow Roberta (Diane Keaton) receives news of the death of her estranged brother. Upon arriving in her hometown for her brother's funeral, Roberta receives an unexpected inheritance, her nine-year-old nephew Jack (Joseph Cross). Savvy and curious, Jack and Roberta struggle to find common ground.

Cast

 Diane Keaton as Roberta Blumstein
 Maury Chaykin as Ben Rubadue
 Joseph Cross as Jack
 Kathleen York as Daphne
 John Robert Hoffman as Joe Scarlotti
 Frank C. Turner as Willard
 Thomas Cavanagh as Frank
 Alexander Pollock as Billy
 David Paul Grove as Buck
 Crystal Verge as Aggie
 John R. Taylor as Arthur
 Sheila Patterson as Arlene
 Peter Wilds as Ratman
 Chilton Crane as Margaret
 Sheila Moore as Louise
 Leam Blackwood as Emily
 Zahf Paroo as Young Manager (as Zang Haju)
 Phillip Hazel as Sterling

Recognition
 1998, Young Artist Awards for 'Best Performance, Leading Young Actor' for Joseph Cross

References

External links
 

Disney Channel original films
American television films
1997 television films
1997 films
Films directed by Linda Yellen
1990s English-language films
1990s American films